Condylomitra bernhardina is a species of sea snail, a marine gastropod mollusk in the family Mitridae, the miters or miter snails.

Description
The shell size varies between 12 mm and 30 mm

Distribution
This species is distributed in the Indian Ocean along Mozambique, Mauritius and the Mascarene Basin and in the Pacific Ocean along Queensland, the Solomons Islands, Papua New Guinea and the Philippines.

References

 Michel, C. (1988). Marine molluscs of Mauritius. Editions de l'Ocean Indien. Stanley, Rose Hill. Mauritius
 Drivas, J. & M. Jay (1988). Coquillages de La Réunion et de l'île Maurice

External links
 Röding P.F. (1798). Museum Boltenianum sive Catalogus cimeliorum e tribus regnis naturæ quæ olim collegerat Joa. Fried Bolten, M. D. p. d. per XL. annos proto physicus Hamburgensis. Pars secunda continens Conchylia sive Testacea univalvia, bivalvia & multivalvia. Trapp, Hamburg. viii, 199 pp
 Fedosov A., Puillandre N., Herrmann M., Kantor Yu., Oliverio M., Dgebuadze P., Modica M.V. & Bouchet P. (2018). The collapse of Mitra: molecular systematics and morphology of the Mitridae (Gastropoda: Neogastropoda). Zoological Journal of the Linnean Society. 183(2): 253-337
 Gastropods.com : Vexillum (Pusia) bernhardina; accessed : 28 January 2011
 W.O.Cernohorsky, The Mitridae of Fiji - The Veliger v. 8 (1965-1966)

Mitridae
Gastropods described in 1798